Bill is a masculine given name, generally a short form (hypocorism) of William. It can also be used as the adaptation into English of the popular Greek name Vasilis or Vasileios (Basil), especially amongst Greek immigrants in English-speaking countries, probably due to similarly in the sound.

People named Bill include:

Bill Allen (disambiguation), multiple people
Bill Allison (disambiguation), multiple people
Bill Barr (born 1950), Former Attorney General of the United States
Bill Barrett (disambiguation), multiple people
Bill Barrett (1929–2016), American politician
Bill Barretta (born 1964), American actor and puppeteer
Bill Bennett (1932–2015), Canadian politician
Bill Belichick (born 1952), head coach/general manager of the NFL's New England Patriots since 2000
Bill Bixby (1934–1993), American actor and director
Bill Bowman (racing driver), former NASCAR Cup Series driver
Bill Bradley (born 1943), American politician and basketball player
Bill Buckner (1949–2019), American baseball player
Bill Burr (born 1968), American comedian
Bill Clinton (born 1946), 42nd President of the United States
Bill Craver (1844–1901), American baseball player
Bill Cosby (born 1937), American stand-up comedian, actor, musician and author who was convicted of sexual assault
Bill Cowher (born 1957), American retired National Football League head coach and player
Bill de Blasio (born 1961), American politician, Mayor of New York City
Bill DuLac (born 1951), American football player
Bill Elliott (born 1955), American retired NASCAR driver
Bill Evans (1929–1980), American jazz pianist
Bill Graham (born 1939), Canadian politician
Bill Fagerbakke (born 1957), American voice actor
Bill Farmer (born 1952), American voice actor
Bill Foster (disambiguation), multiple people
Bill Frist (born 1952), American politician
Bill Gates (disambiguation)
Bill Gates (born 1955), American business magnate, investor, author, philanthropist, and co-founder of Microsoft
Bill Goldberg (born 1966), American professional NFL football player and professional wrestler
Bill Hanson (basketball) (born c. 1940), basketball player
Bill Hader (born 1978), American comedian
Bill Haley (1929–1981), American musician
Bill Haslam (born 1958), American businessman and politician
Bill Hicks (1961–1994), American comedian
Bill Irwin (born 1950), American actor, best known for playing Mr. Noodle on Sesame Street
Bill James (disambiguation)
Bill James (born 1949), American baseball writer
Bill Knowlton (1898–1944), American baseball player
Bill Kurtis (born 1940), American TV personality
Bill Lear (1902–1978), American inventor and businessman, founder of the Lear Jet Corporation
Bill Lennon (1845–1910), American baseball player
Bill Maher (disambiguation)
Bill Maher (born 1956), American comedian, political commentator and television host
Bill Medley (born 1940), American singer and songwriter, half of The Righteous Brothers
Bill Mitchell (born 1960), American politician
Bill Miner (c. 1847–1913), American Old West stagecoach and train robber
Bill Murray (disambiguation)
Bill Murray (born 1950), American actor, comedian, and writer
Bill Nelson, American politician, former US Senator
Bill Nighy (born 1949), British actor
Bill Nye (disambiguation)
Bill Nye (born 1955), American science communicator, television presenter and mechanical engineer, known as "Bill Nye the Science Guy"
Bill O'Reilly (disambiguation)
Bill Oakley (born 1966), American TV writer and producer
Bill Oberst Jr., an American stage, film, and television actor
Bill Owen (1914–1999), English actor
Bill Parcells (born 1941), American former National Football League head coach
Bill Paxton (1955–2017), American actor and director
Bill Peet (1915–2002), American author and animator
Bill Potts (disambiguation) (multiple persons)
Bill Pullman (born 1953), American actor
Bill Ramsey (1931–2021), German-American singer and actor 
William Robinson (disambiguation), which includes several Bills
Bill Robinson (1878–1949), African-American tap dancer and actor nicknamed "Bojangles"
Bill Russell (1934–2022), American Hall-of-Fame retired National Basketball Association player
Bill Schwarz British historian, academic and writer
Bill Shankly (1913–1981), British Soccer Manager
Bill Skarsgård (born 1990), Swedish actor known for portraying Pennywise the dancing clown
Bill Stearns (1853–1898), American baseball player
Bill Stemmyer (1865–1945), American professional baseball player
Bill Sweek (born 1946/1947), American basketball player and coach
Bill Vander Zalm (born 1934), Canadian politician
Bill W. (1895–1971), co-founder of Alcoholics Anonymous
Bill Walsh (1931–2007), American National Football League head coach
Bill Walker (born 1987), American basketball player
Bill Walton (born 1952), American Hall-of-Fame retired National Basketball Association player
Bill Ward (born 1948), English musician, drummer for Black Sabbath
Bill Watterson (born 1958), American cartoonist, author of the comic strip Calvin and Hobbes
Bill Weld (born 1945), American attorney, 68th governor of Massachusetts
Bill Wiggin, British Member of Parliament
Bill Wold, American basketball player 
Bill Wurtz (born 1989) American musician and video creator. 
Bill Wyman (born William George Perks Jr. in 1936), English musician, record producer, songwriter and singer, former bass guitarist for the Rolling Stones

Fictional characters
Bill Cipher, a character in Gravity Falls 
Bill Dauterive, a character from King of the Hill
Bill Denbrough, a character in the novel and film It (2017 film)
Bill Potts (Doctor Who), a character in Doctor Who
Bill S. Preston, Esq, a character in Bill & Ted's Excellent Adventure, and it's sequels
Bill Sikes, main antagonist from Oliver Twist
Bill Standall, a character in the Netflix series 13 Reasons Why
Bill the Lizard, a character in Alice's Adventures in Wonderland

See also
Buffalo Bill (1846–1917), American Old West scout, bison hunter and showman whom the NFL's Buffalo Bills derived their name from
"Wild Bill" Hickok (1837–1876), American Old West folk hero
William T. Anderson (1840–1864),  pro-Confederate guerrilla leader in the American Civil War known as "Bloody Bill"
Major “Bloody Bill” Cunningham (1756–1787), American Revolutionary War loyalist
William "Bible Bill" Aberhart (1878–1943), Canadian politician
Big Bill (disambiguation)
Little Bill (disambiguation)
Billy (name)

English masculine given names
English-language masculine given names
Hypocorisms